This is a list of television programs broadcast by Fox Kids around the world.

Australia
 7th Heaven
 Action Man
 Bad Dog
 Beast Wars: Transformers
 Beverly Hills, 90210
 Beyblade
 Braceface
 City Guys
 Clueless
 Cubix
 Digimon: Digital Monsters
 Dinosaurs
 Extreme Ghostbusters
 Galidor
 Heavy Gear: The Animated Series
 Hercules
 Just Deal
 Medabots
 Men In Black: The Series
 Monster Rancher
 My So-Called Life
 Our Hero
 Power Rangers Time Force
 Robot Wars
 Sailor Moon
 Shin-chan
 So Little Time
 Spider-Man Unlimited
 Super Duper Sumos
 Sweet Valley High
 Tales from the Cryptkeeper
 The Hughleys
 The Nanny
 The Parkers
 Transformers: Robots in Disguise
 Uh Oh!
 Ultimate Book of Spells
 Weird Science
 What's with Andy?

Europe
 Black Hole High
 Diabolik
 Hamtaro
 Let's Go Quintuplets!
 Medabots
 Pat & Mat
 Pig City RoboRoach Shaman King Shin-chan Shinzo Sonic X The Kids from Room 402<ref
name="foxkidseurope13332"/>
 Totally Spies! Tracey McBean Tutenstein What's with Andy?IndiaBobby's World Dennis the Menace Disney's Adventures of the Gummi Bears Dungeons & Dragons Iron Man RoboCop: The Animated Series Samurai Pizza Cats Silver Surfer Small WonderThe Tick X-MenItaly
 Winx Club (2003-2005) (first 2 seasons only)

Latin America
 64 Zoo Lane Digimon Masked Rider Power Rangers Wild Force Shin-chan Kirby: Right Back at Ya!Snorks Sonic X Diabolik What's with Andy? Woody WoodpeckerUnited States

This is a list of all programming that aired on the U.S. Fox Kids children's television block.

 Year 1 (1990–1991) 
Year 1 consisted of three hours of programming every Saturday, branded as the Fox Children's Network.

 Attack of the Killer Tomatoes Bobby's World Fox's Fun House (beginning with season 3)
 Fox's Peter Pan & the Pirates Piggsburg Pigs! Tom & Jerry Kids Zazoo U (Fall 1990 only)

Specials
 Dark Water (five-episode miniseries only, February-March 1991)
 Swamp Thing (October 1990, April-May 1991 only)

 Year 2 (1991–1992) 
Year 2 expanded Saturday morning to four hours and added 90 minutes of programming Monday through Friday. It also rebranded the programming block as the Fox Kids Network.

 Attack of the Killer Tomatoes Beetlejuice (beginning with season 4)
 Bill and Ted's Excellent Adventures (beginning with season 2)
 Bobby's World Little Shop Muppet Babies (reruns only, originally aired on CBS)
 Taz-Mania Tom & Jerry KidsSpecials
 Little Dracula (Fall 1991 only)
 Defenders of Dynatron City (pilot only; February 1992)

 Year 3 (1992–1993) 
Year 3 expanded Monday through Friday programming to two and a half and eventually three hours.

 Alvin and the Chipmunks (reruns only, originally aired on NBC)
 Batman: The Animated Series Beetlejuice (reruns only)
 Bobby's World Dog City Eek! The Cat George of the Jungle (reruns only; Fall 1992 only)
 Merrie Melodies Starring Bugs Bunny & Friends (reruns only)
 Mighty Mouse: The New Adventures (reruns only; November 1992)
 Muppet Babies (reruns only)
 Super Dave: Daredevil for Hire Taz-Mania The Plucky Duck Show (Fall 1992 only)
 Tiny Toon Adventures (beginning with season 3)
 Tom & Jerry Kids X-MenSpecials
 Ghostwriter (pilot only; October 1992)
 Solarman (pilot only; October 1992)
 The Incredible Crash Dummies (May 1993)

 Year 4 (1993–1994) 
 Animaniacs Batman: The Animated Series Bobby's World Dog City Droopy, Master Detective Eek! The Cat / The Terrible Thunderlizards / Eek! and The Terrible Thunderlizards Merrie Melodies Starring Bugs Bunny & Friends (reruns only)
 Mighty Morphin Power Rangers Taz-Mania Tiny Toon Adventures (reruns only)
 Tom & Jerry Kids Where on Earth Is Carmen Sandiego? (Spring 1994 premiere)
 X-Men (Spring 1994 premiere)

Specials
 Red Planet (May 1994 only)
 Thunderbirds (edited reruns of 1960s TV series; Summer 1994 only)
 Trollies Christmas Sing-Along ("Cool Yule", December 1993)

 Year 5 (1994–1995) 
 Animaniacs Batman: The Animated Series Bobby's World Dog City (Fall 1994 only)
 Droopy, Master Detective (Fall 1994 only)
 Eek! Stravaganza Eek! The Cat The Terrible Thunderlizards Mighty Morphin Power Rangers Spider-Man Taz-Mania Tiny Toon Adventures (reruns only)
 The Fox Cubhouse:
 Jim Henson's Animal Show Johnson and Friends Rimba's Island The Tick Where on Earth Is Carmen Sandiego? X-MenSpecials
 A.J.'s Time Travelers (December 1994 only)
 Christopher the Christmas Tree ("Santa Saturday", December 1994)
 Count DeClues' Mystery Castle (October 1994)
 Grunt & Punt Life with Louie (pilot only; December 1994)
 Talkin' It Out (May 1995)

 Year 6 (1995–1996) 
 Attack of the Killer Tomatoes (reruns only; Spring 1996 only)
 Batman: The Animated Series / The Adventures of Batman & Robin Bobby's World C Bear and Jamal (February 1996 only)
 Casper (Spring 1996 premiere)
 Eek! Stravaganza:
 Eek! The Cat Klutter! The Terrible Thunderlizards Goosebumps Life with Louie Masked Rider Mighty Morphin Power Rangers / Mighty Morphin Alien Rangers / Power Rangers Zeo Spider-Man Taz-Mania The Fox Cubhouse:
 Budgie the Little Helicopter Jim Henson's Animal Show Johnson and Friends Rimba's Island Magic Adventures of Mumfie The Tick Where on Earth Is Carmen Sandiego? X-MenSpecials
 Sailor Moon (one episode in September 1995 only)
 Siegfried & Roy: Masters of the Impossible (February 1996 only)

 Year 7 (1996–1997) 
 The Adventures of Batman & Robin Big Bad Beetleborgs (1996–1997)
 Bobby's World C Bear and Jamal Casper Eek! Stravaganza:
 Eek! The Cat The Terrible Thunderlizards Eerie, Indiana (reruns only; Spring 1997 premiere)
 Fox's Peter Pan & the Pirates (Fall 1996 only)
 Goosebumps Life with Louie Mighty Morphin Power Rangers / Power Rangers Zeo / Power Rangers Turbo Round the Twist (reruns only; Summer 1997 only)
 Spider-Man The Tick (Fall 1996 only)
 Where on Earth Is Carmen Sandiego? X-MenSpecials
 The Balloonatiks: Christmas Without a Claus ("Cool Yule", December 1996)

 Year 8 (1997–1998) 
 The Adventures of Sam & Max: Freelance Police Beetleborgs Metallix Bobby's World C Bear and Jamal (reruns only)
 Casper Eek! Stravaganza: (Summer 1998 only)
 Eek! The Cat The Terrible Thunderlizards Eerie, Indiana / Eerie, Indiana: The Other Dimension (Spring 1998 premiere)
 Life with Louie Mowgli: The New Adventures of the Jungle Book (Spring 1998 only)
 Ned's Newt (Spring 1998 premiere, originally aired on Canadian television in 1997)
 Ninja Turtles: The Next Mutation Power Rangers Turbo / Power Rangers in Space Silver Surfer (Spring 1998 only)
 Space Goofs Spider-Man Stickin' Around (reruns only)
 Toonsylvania (Spring 1998 premiere)
 Goosebumps/Ultimate Goosebumps Where On Earth Is Carmen Sandiego? (Spring 1998 only)
 X-Men

Specials
 Chimp Lips Theater (two pilots only)

Year 9 (1998–1999) 
 Bobby's World (reruns only after the cancellation of the show)
 Casper (Fall 1998 only)
 Godzilla: The Series
 Goosebumps
 Life with Louie
 Mad Jack the Pirate
 Mighty Morphin Power Rangers / Power Rangers in Space / Power Rangers Lost Galaxy
 Mystic Knights of Tir Na Nog
 Ned's Newt
 Oggy and the Cockroaches
 Space Goofs
 Spider-Man
 Toonsylvania
 The Magic School Bus (reruns only, originally aired on PBS)
 The Magician (Spring 1999 only)
 The Mr. Potato Head Show
 The New Woody Woodpecker Show (Spring 1999 premiere)
 The Secret Files of the Spy Dogs
 Young Hercules

Specials
 Donkey Kong Country (reruns only; December 1998 and Summer 1999 only)

Year 10 (1999–2000) 
 Beast Machines: Transformers
 Beast Wars: Transformers (reruns only)
 Big Guy and Rusty the Boy Robot (Fall 1999 only)
 Cybersix (Fall 1999 only)
 Digimon: Digital Monsters
 Flint the Time Detective (Spring 2000 premiere)
 Godzilla: The Series
 Mighty Morphin Power Rangers / Power Rangers Lost Galaxy / Power Rangers Lightspeed Rescue
 Monster Rancher
 NASCAR Racers
 Sherlock Holmes in the 22nd Century
 The Avengers: United They Stand
 The Magic School Bus (reruns only)
 The New Woody Woodpecker Show
 Xyber 9: New Dawn (Fall 1999 only)

Specials
 Spider-Man Unlimited (October 1999 only)

Year 11 (2000–2001) 
Year 11 saw Monday through Friday programming reduced to two hours.

 Action Man
 Angela Anaconda (Summer 2000 only)
 Beast Machines: Transformers
 Big Guy and Rusty the Boy Robot (Spring 2001 only)
 Cybersix (Fall 2000 only)
 Digimon: Digital Monsters
 Dinozaurs (Fall 2000 only)
 Dungeons & Dragons (reruns only; Fall 2000 only)
 Escaflowne
 Flint the Time Detective
 Kong: The Animated Series (reruns only; Summer 2001 only)
 Los Luchadores (Spring 2001 premiere)
 Monster Rancher
 NASCAR Racers
 Power Rangers Lightspeed Rescue / Power Rangers Time Force
 Spider-Man (reruns only; Summer 2001)
 Spider-Man Unlimited
 The Magic School Bus (reruns only)
 The New Woody Woodpecker Show
 X-Men

Year 12 (2001–2002) 
Year 12 saw the discontinuation of Monday through Friday programming in December 2001 and the discontinuation of all Fox Kids programming in September 2002.

 Action Man
 Alienators: Evolution Continues
 Digimon: Digital Monsters
 Galidor: Defenders of the Outer Dimension (Spring 2002 premiere)
 Medabots
 Mon Colle Knights (Spring 2002 premiere)
 Monster Rancher
 Moolah Beach (Fall 2001 only)
 Power Rangers Time Force / Power Rangers Wild Force
 The Magic School Bus (reruns only)
 The Ripping Friends
 New Woody Woodpecker Show
 Transformers: Robots In Disguise

See also
 List of programs broadcast by Jetix
 Fox Family Channel
 Fox Kids
 Jetix
 4Kids TV

Notes

References

 
Fox Kids